The Babel function (also known as cumulative coherence) measures the maximum total coherence between a fixed atom and a collection of other atoms in a dictionary. The Babel function was conceived of in the context of signals for which there exists a sparse representation consisting of atoms or columns of a redundant dictionary matrix, A.

Definition and formulation
The Babel function of a dictionary  with normalized columns is a real-valued function that is defined as

where  are the columns (atoms) of the dictionary .

Special case
When p=1, the babel function is the mutual coherence.

Pratical Applications
Li and Lin have used the Babel function to aid in creating effective dictionaries for Machine Learning applications.

References

See also 
 Compressed sensing

Signal processing